In re Stolar, 401 U.S. 23 (1971), was a case in which the Supreme Court of the United States held that requiring bar applicants to list every organization that one belonged to since age 17 is unconstitutional.

See also
List of United States Supreme Court cases, volume 401

References

External links
 
 

United States Supreme Court cases
United States Supreme Court cases of the Burger Court
United States professional responsibility case law
1971 in United States case law